Banca Mediocredito del Friuli Venezia Giulia S.p.A. is an Italian commercial bank based in Udine, Friuli – Venezia Giulia region.

History
Istituto di Credito per il Finanziamento a Medio Termine alle Medie e Piccole Industrie Situate nel Territorio della Provincia di Udine was found on 31 July 1957 to provide medium-term loan to the companies of the Province of Udine, as an ente di diritto pubblico. The bank later expanded to cover the whole Friuli – Venezia Giulia region. The bank at first had 1.340 billion lire capital, provided by central government (1 billion lire) and the banks in north-eastern Italy. (Cassa di Risparmio di Udine, Banca Cattolica del Veneto, Banca del Friuli, Banca Popolare Cooperativa Udinese, Banca Popolare Cooperativa di Pordenone and Cassa San Giuseppe di Pordenone.)

Due to Legge Amato Mediocredito del Friuli – Venezia Giulia was transformed into a "company limited by shares" on 3 May 1993 (gazetted on 21 May). The bank also established Medioleasing Friuli – Venezia Giulia in 1994, as well as acquiring Friulia Lis from indirect parent company Finanziaria Regionale Friuli Venezia Giulia (Friulia).

Shareholders
 Finanziaria Mediocredito in liquidation (Friuli – Venezia Giulia region & Friulia S.p.A.) 
 Fondazione Cassa di Risparmio di Trieste
 Finanziaria delle Banche di Credito Cooperativo del Friuli Venezia Giulia e per lo sviluppo del territori
 Banca Popolare FriulAdria
 Banca Popolare di Cividale
 Confindustria Udine
 UniCredit
 Cassa di Risparmio del Friuli Venezia Giulia
 Unione Industriali Pordenone
 Assicurazioni Generali
 Banco di Brescia
 Veneto Banca
 Banca Intermobiliare
 ASCOM Servizi S.r.l.
 Istituto Nazionale per l'Assicurazione Contro gli Infortuni sul Lavoro

References

External links

 

Banks established in 1957
Banks of Italy
Companies based in Udine
Government of Friuli-Venezia Giulia
Partly privatized companies of Italy
Region-owned companies of Italy
Italian  companies established in 1957